This is the discography of the American rock band Lit. They have released six studio albums, one compilation album, one EP, one live album, thirteen singles, and twenty-three music videos.

Albums

Studio albums

Compilation albums

Live albums

Extended plays

Singles

As lead artist

As featured artist

Music videos

Soundtrack appearances

References 

Discographies of American artists
Pop punk group discographies